Wagons Westward is a 1940 American Western film directed by Lew Landers, written by Joseph Moncure March and Harrison Jacobs and starring Chester Morris, Anita Louise, Buck Jones, Ona Munson, George "Gabby" Hayes and Guinn "Big Boy" Williams. It was released on June 19, 1940 by Republic Pictures.

Plot
Twin brothers David and Tom Cook go their separate ways, David as a lawman, Tom as an outlaw. Tom is in league with corrupt sheriff Jim McDaniels and at odds with two members of his gang, Hardman and Marsden. The honest, upright David has few allies except for an elderly uncle, Hardtack.

Saloon singer Phyllis O'Conover is in love with Tom even though he has gone bad. Because of a case of mistaken identities, she marries his twin. Tom considers this unforgivable, even though Phyllis was sincerely in love with him, and kills her. David falls in love with Phyllis's jealous older sister Julie.

A showdown occurs between the twins. Tom has the drop on David and appears to be the victor until he is shot dead by their uncle.

Cast
Chester Morris as David Cook / Tom Cook
Anita Louise as Phyllis O'Conover
Buck Jones as Sheriff Jim McDaniels
Ona Munson as Julie O'Conover
George "Gabby" Hayes as Hardtack 
Guinn "Big Boy" Williams as Jake Hardman 
Douglas Fowley as Bill Marsden
John Gallaudet as Blackie
Virginia Brissac as Angela Cook
Trevor Bardette as Alan Cook
Selmer Jackson as Major Marlowe
Charles Stevens as Pima
Warren Hull as Young Tom Cook
Wayne Hull as Young David Cook 
Max Waizmann as Storekeeper

References

External links 
 

1940 films
American Western (genre) films
1940 Western (genre) films
Republic Pictures films
Films directed by Lew Landers
Films scored by William Lava
American black-and-white films
1940s English-language films
1940s American films